Major-General Geoffrey Herbert Anthony White  (3 November 1870 – 15 December 1959) was a British Army officer who became Commandant of the Royal Military Academy, Woolwich.

Military career
Educated at Eton College and the Royal Military Academy, Woolwich, White was commissioned into the Royal Artillery as a second lieutenant on 25 July 1890, and promoted to lieutenant on 25 July 1893. He served in the Second Boer War and took part in the Relief of Kimberley, during which he was promoted to captain on 13 February 1900. In 1910 he became Superintendent of the Royal Artillery Riding Establishment. He served in World War I as Commander of K Battery, Royal Horse Artillery and as Commander, Royal Artillery for 30th Division. He was appointed Commandant of the Royal Military Academy, Woolwich in 1918, Commandant of the Woolwich Sub-Area in 1920 and Director of Remounts at the War Office in 1925 before he retired in 1929.

He was author of the book Single And Pair Horse Driving published by the British Driving Society in 1950.

Family
In 1918 White married Beatrice de Chair.

References

1870 births
1959 deaths
British Army generals of World War I
Commandants of the Royal Military Academy, Woolwich
Companions of the Order of the Bath
Companions of the Order of St Michael and St George
Companions of the Distinguished Service Order
Royal Artillery officers
People educated at Eton College